= Jay Cross (American football executive) =

American football executive

Jay Cross is an American football executive. From 2001 until 2007, he served as the President of the New York Jets. He was credited with helping the Jets secure the rights to MetLife Stadium.

Cross left the Jets in 2008 to work for Related Hudson Yards.
